Exaucé Ngassaki Ndongo (born 30 January 1997) is a Congolese professional footballer who plays as a forward for Trélissac FC.

Club career
Ngassaki made his professional debut for Montpellier in a 1–0 Ligue 1 win over Nancy on 21 February 2017.

In July 2019, Ngassaki joined Championnat National 3 Saint-Colomban Locminé.

International career
Ngassaki was first called up to the Republic of the Congo national team for a friendly match against Mauritania on 28 March 2017.

References

External links
 
 
 Maxifoot Profile
 Sofoot Profile
 

Living people
1997 births
Republic of the Congo footballers
Republic of the Congo expatriate footballers
Sportspeople from Brazzaville
Association football forwards
Stade Malherbe Caen players
Stade Brestois 29 players
Stade Plabennécois players
Saint-Colomban Sportive Locminé players
FC Chamalières players
Trélissac FC players
Ligue 1 players
Championnat National 2 players
Championnat National 3 players
Republic of the Congo expatriate sportspeople in France
Expatriate footballers in France